The Mokolo Dam Nature Reserve or Mokolo Dam Provincial Park is a protected area of bushveld in the Limpopo province, South Africa. It almost surrounds the Mokolo Dam on the Mokolo River. It is located 32 km south of Lephalale, just northeast of the Marakele National Park and not far from the Lapalala Game Reserve.

The reserve is only 46 km and is surrounded by the Waterberg Biosphere. There is both sourveld and sweetveld here, and attractions include water sports, birds, and fish. Largemouth bass, bream, carp, and catfish can all be fished there, but one must watch for crocodiles.

Among the birds that can be spotted here are the following:

 Crested barbet
 African fish eagle
 Brown-hooded kingfisher
 Southern grey-headed sparrow
 Egyptian goose
 White-fronted bee eater
 Magpie shrike

See also 
 Protected areas of South Africa

References

External links
Mokolo Dam Nature Reserve, Limpopo
State of Rivers Report: the Mokolo River

Nature reserves in South Africa
Limpopo Provincial Parks